Gérôme Heutchou (born 27 September 1991) is a Cameroonian football midfielder who plays for APEJES Academy.

References

1991 births
Living people
Cameroonian footballers
Cameroon international footballers
Les Astres players
New Star de Douala players
Union Douala players
F.C. Cape Town players
Ubuntu Cape Town F.C. players
APEJES Academy players
Association football midfielders
Cameroonian expatriate footballers
Expatriate soccer players in South Africa
Cameroonian expatriate sportspeople in South Africa